Ivan Harold McLelland (born March 15, 1931) was a Canadian ice hockey player with the Penticton Vees. He won a gold medal at the 1955 World Ice Hockey Championships in West Germany. In 2005, he was inducted into the BC Sports Hall of Fame and Museum. He was born in South Porcupine, Ontario (now part of Timmins, Ontario).

References

1931 births
Living people
Canadian ice hockey goaltenders
Ice hockey people from Ontario
Penticton Vees players
Sportspeople from Timmins